Bae Cheol-soo (born August 18, 1953) is a South Korean radio host and former singer. His syndicated talk radio show Bae Cheol-soo's Music Camp, airs via the MBC FM4U since 1990.

Life
Bae was born in 1953 in Gahoedong, Jongno district in Seoul.He graduated from Korea Aerospace University, and served in the military and was discharged as a staff sergeant in 1977.In 1978 he was one of the contestants as part of the group "RUNAWAY(Also known as hwaljooro)" in the 1st beach singing competition hosted by Tongyang Broadcasting Company, with the song,"I have lived my life without knowing the world". In 1979, he formed the band Songgolmae, where he played the drum and contributed vocals.

References

External links

1953 births
Living people
South Korean radio presenters
South Korean male singers
South Korean folk rock singers
Musicians from Seoul